Sevierville Commercial Historic District is a  historic district in Sevierville, Tennessee.  It has 21 contributing buildings along sections of Bruce Street, Court Avenue, and Commerce Street including the Sevier County Courthouse (which is separately NRHP-listed). The courthouse was built in 1896 one block south of the town square where the former courthouse was located.

Buildings in the district are:
136 E. Bruce Street
132 E. Bruce Street
120 E. Bruce Street (c.1970), non-contributing
118 E. Bruce Street (c.1925), one-story brick building
110-114 E. Bruce Street
158 Court Avenue, Yett store
150 Court Avenue
138-142 Court Avenue
134 Court Avenue
128 Court Avenue
120 Court Avenue
112-118 Court Avenue
110 Court Avenue
115-117 Court Avenue
119 Court Avenue
121 Court Avenue
111 Commerce Street (c.1930), two-story building with a second story balcony and a stepped parapet 
Sevier County Courthouse
102 W. Bruce Street (1906), two-story brick wholesale house for the M. Yett and Son merchandise company.  As of 1986, had its "original doors, arched windows and corbelled brick cornice."
101 E. Bruce Street (1923), three-story building with stepped parapet, originally the First National Bank 
105 E. Bruce Street
123-125 E. Bruce Street 
129 E. Bruce Street, and
131 E. Bruce Street.

References

Historic districts on the National Register of Historic Places in Tennessee
National Register of Historic Places in Sevier County, Tennessee
Buildings and structures completed in 1896